The bourse of Antwerp was the world's first purpose-built commodity exchange. Falling into disuse in the 17th century, from 1872 until 1997 the restored building housed the Antwerp Stock Exchange. After further restoration, the building is now part of an events venue that goes by the English name Antwerp Trade Fair. The Royal Exchange, London was modelled on the Antwerp Exchange.

History

1531: Inception
As Antwerp took over the role of trade center from Bruges, it grew into a large metropolis with more than 100,000 inhabitants, including 10,000 foreign merchants, mostly Spaniards and Portuguese. From 1531 the old bourse was given a new building, conceived as a rectangular square with galleries covered on four sides, built on top of a street intersection. For half a century this exchange would be the focal point of European trade and the model for cities with similar ambitions.

On the initiative of Thomas Gresham, the representative of the English crown in Antwerp, the Royal Exchange, London was opened in 1565 on this model. It was also called "the Bourse" until Queen Elizabeth I, after a visit on January 23, 1570, changed its name to the Royal Exchange. The Middelburg stock exchange was opened in 1592, then Rotterdam in 1595 and Amsterdam in 1611.

The first building in Brabant's late Gothic style dates from 1531, after a design by Domien de Waghemakere. A rectangular open space was enclosed by a colonnade covered with star and net vaults. The gallery concept of this building served as a model for London's Royal Exchange (designed by Hendrik van Paesschen), as well as for Rotterdam, Amsterdam and Lille. The high-rise 'pagoda towers' with octagonal and cylindrical hull may have served as a lookout for the harbor. Every nation had a more or less permanent location at the exchange.

1583: First fire, siege
After a fire in 1583, the Bourse was immediately rebuilt to the same plan. The Siege of Antwerp (1584-1585) and the surrender to the 'Spanish' Army of Flanders led to a decline in trade, with Antwerp unable to compete with Amsterdam. Between 1661 and 1810 the building was used, among other things, as a drawing academy and seat of the Guild of Saint Luke. The open interior space was domed in 1853 by Charles Marcellis, following the example of London's Crystal Palace.

1858: Second fire
After a second fire in 1858 had once again destroyed the building, the Antwerp city authorities twice organized a design competition in which the old concept had to be preserved. The current building was finally completed in 1872 by architect Joseph Schadde. It is a remarkable combination of the neo-gothic style and revolutionary techniques, in particular the metal construction for the covering of the interior. The building housed the Antwerp Stock Exchange (a true stock exchange) from 1872 until its 1997 merger with the Brussels Stock Exchange.

1997: Merger with Brussels Stock Exchange, building abandoned
With the closure of the Antwerp Stock Exchange in 1997, the building lost its function and was abandoned and neglected. After a long and intensive renovation, it was reopened in October 2019 as an event hall with restaurant, hotel and public passage. The ground floor with its beautiful central square is open to the public from Saturday to Sunday, between 10:00 and 17:00.

The building will be used as a venue for the 2021 World Choir Games, co-hosted by Antwerp and Ghent. 

The Antwerp Trade Fair is an events venue in the Belgian city of Antwerp, located in the Twaalfmaandenstraat, a side street of the Meir. It encompasses the building of the Bourse of Antwerp, which has been described as "the mother of all stock exchanges". From 1531 to 1661, it was the site of the world's first dedicated commodity exchange, and after extensive renovations it housed the Antwerp stock exchange from 1872 until 1997.

After the 1997 merger of the Antwerp stock exchange with the Brussels stock exchange, and the advent of online trading, the exchange building in Antwerp fell into disuse, with various proposals to redevelop the building going nowhere for fifteen years. The investment file started moving again in October 2013, after a new partner was found: the Marriott hotel chain. A heritage budget was also released from the Flemish government for the restoration of the Bourse. In October 2014, it was announced that the new building application for the project was approved by the city of Antwerp. But at the beginning of December 2014, it became known that various local residents had appealed to the permanent deputation of the province against the building permit. In April 2015, the province confirmed the building permit on the condition of a few adjustments to meet the concerns of local residents. The hotel is currently expected to open in spring 2020.

In February 2016, as part of excavations to convert the site into a Marriott Hotel, various archaeological finds were made. Floor levels, walls, and a fireplace/oven from the late Middle Ages were found. Pile pits were also found under a number of walls that probably point to medieval timber construction. Dark gray sand was also found, indicating medieval garden and / or agriculture. The most remarkable find, however, was the discovery of some urns dating from the Iron Age. When the excavations and archaeological investigation are completed, an underground parking garage would be built under the former Bourse.

References

Stock exchanges in Europe
Financial services companies of Belgium
Companies established in the 15th century
Archaeological sites in Belgium
History of Antwerp
Buildings and structures in Antwerp